The Big Valley Creation Science Museum is a creationist museum in Big Valley, Alberta, Canada. It is dedicated to promoting creation science and young-earth creationism. The institution is the first creationist museum to open in Canada.

History 
The museum opened to the public on 5 June 2007 by Harry Nibourg, an oil field worker with little formal education. Exhibits include an interactive display about the bacterium flagellum, tracing how the ancestry of the royal family is supposedly connected to Adam and Eve, and how fossils are supposed evidence for the Genesis flood.

The museum attracted 40 to 80 visitors weekly in 2007.

See also
 List of museums in Alberta
 Pseudoscience
 Religious cosmology

References

External links
 

Creationist museums
Museums established in 2007
Religious museums in Alberta
21st-century religious buildings and structures in Canada